The Aberdeen Black Cats were a minor league baseball team, based in Aberdeen, Washington that played sporadically in various Washington based leagues between 1903 and 1918.

External links
Baseball Reference
Photograph of Baseball Team about 1900

Defunct minor league baseball teams
1903 establishments in Washington (state)
1918 disestablishments in Washington (state)
Defunct baseball teams in Washington (state)
Baseball teams disestablished in 1918
Baseball teams established in 1903
Washington State League teams